Morya may refer to:

 Morya (Theosophy), one of the "Masters of the Ancient Wisdom" spoken of in modern Theosophy
 Morya Gosavi, a prominent saint of the Hindu Ganapatya sect
 Morya (film), 2011 Marathi film 
"Ganapati Bappa Morya", a chant in the Ganesh Chaturthi, a Hindu festival of Ganesha

See also
Moira (disambiguation)
Morea (disambiguation)
Moria (disambiguation)
Moriah (disambiguation)